Toke is a given name, commonly used for males in Scandinavia and either gender in Finland. The name may refer to:

People
Chief Toke, 19th-century Native American leader
Toke Holst (born 1981), Danish handball player
Toke Makinwa (born 1984), Nigerian radio and television presenter
Toke Reichstein (born 1976), Danish economist
Toke Talagi (born 1960), Niuean politician and premier
Toke Townley (1912–1984), British actor

See also
Toke (disambiguation)

Notes

Danish masculine given names
Unisex given names